The following lists events that happened during 1957 in Laos.

Incumbents
Monarch: Sisavang Vong 
Prime Minister: Souvanna Phouma

Events

May
11 May - Laos withdraws from the French Union.

Births
12 July - Vang Pobzeb

References

 
1950s in Laos
Years of the 20th century in Laos
Laos
Laos